Beat Happening is an American indie pop band formed in Olympia, Washington in 1982. Calvin Johnson, Heather Lewis, and Bret Lunsford have been the band's continual members. Beat Happening were early leaders in the American indie pop and lo-fi movements, noted for their use of primitive recording techniques, disregard for the technical aspects of musicianship, and songs with subject matters of a childish or coy nature.

History

Formation
Beat Happening met while attending The Evergreen State College and began recording in 1983. The band took its name from a student art film, Beatnik Happening, made by Bret's girlfriend. The band's basic line-up was drums, guitar and vocals, though when they formed their only instruments were a pair of maracas and a Sears Silvertone guitar purchased at a thrift shop. Heather once joked in an interview that the history of the band could be told through a list of the various people whose drums they'd borrowed. Heather and Calvin had been members of a previous band and approached Bret, who had no musical experience at the time, saying they ought to start a band and go to Japan.

Early recordings made use of an Echoplex machine to add heavy reverb to Bret's guitar, in an attempt to mask his poor performance.

The band traveled to Tokyo in 1984 with intentions of touring. Their first show in Japan was at the high school of a former exchange student Calvin knew. The band members recorded Three Tea Breakfast, a 5-song EP that marked the band's first release.

Studio albums
Beat Happening (1985), their full-length debut, was critically acclaimed, as was Jamboree (1988). By the release of Dreamy in 1991, Beat Happening was one of the most popular bands in the indie rock community, leading to their pivotal role in the International Pop Underground Festival, which brought anti-corporate rock its earliest mainstream acceptance. Their last full-length album was 1992's You Turn Me On, which represented the band breaking many of their established conventions from earlier albums, most notably on "Godsend", which runs 9 minutes and features blatant use of multitrack recording. The album was described by allmusic.com as a "masterpiece." Though never announcing a break-up and claiming at one point to still practice once a month, the members of Beat Happening have moved on to various other projects. In 2000 they released the "Angel Gone" single, their first new release in eight years.

Crashing Through, which collects all of the band's officially released music except for two of their tracks from a live cassette split with The Vaselines, was released in 2002. The box set included a booklet containing a lengthy essay on the history and impact of the band by Lois Maffeo, as well as rare photos of Calvin, Heather, and Bret.

In September 2015, the band announced the release of a new compilation spanning their entire career entitled Look Around, which was released by Domino Records on 20 November 2015.

With the full cooperation of the band and Calvin's K Records label, Domino released a vinyl box set of the entire Beat Happening discography, We Are Beat Happening, in November of 2019.

Influence
The English indie-pop band This Many Boyfriends are named after a Beat Happening song - namely The This Many Boyfriends Club. The Swedish band Friendly Boyfriend, likened to a "corrupted Beat Happening," has a name that recalls the lyric "You got a friendly boyfriend" from Beat Happening's song "T.V. Girl." The United States band The Snogs have also been compared to Beat Happening, and have released tracks such as "Tastes Like Candy," "Couple of Sleepyheads," and Teenage Sleepyhead" recalling Beat Happening song titles "Black Candy" and "Sleepy Head." 

Beat Happening's live performances stood out for Calvin's dancing moves (pogo, hula, and shimmy), which he'd seen on news reports about UK punks. His onstage behavior did not ingratiate the band to hardcore audiences when they toured with Fugazi in the late 1980s, and audiences were openly hostile, even throwing an ashtray at the band. Nonetheless, rock critic Michael Azzerrad suggests that Beat Happening "was a major force in widening the idea of a punk rocker from a mohawked guy in a motorcycle jacket to a nerdy girl in a cardigan." The presence of Heather Lewis on drums and Calvin's non-threatening stage presence presented a wider variety of behaviors and identities than other acts in the hardcore scene of the time, which was predominantly male and focused on aggression or hyper-masculinity. Beat Happening has been cited as an influence on early riot grrl acts such as Bratmobile and Kathi Wilcox of Bikini Kill. Kurt Cobain had the K Records logo tattooed on his forearm, saying it was to "try and remind me to stay a child." The song "Lounge Act" on Nevermind references his logo tattoo in the line, “I'll arrest myself and wear a shield.” Cobain also played guitar on a K Records release, "Bikini Twilight," with Johnson, released as The Go Team.

Calvin Johnson was one of the founders of indie-rock label K Records, and comprised one-half of the indie pop band The Go Team, along with Tobi Vail; they had an approach and aesthetic similar to that of Beat Happening.

Current status
Though not officially broken up, the band has not performed together in public since the early 1990s.

Members
Calvin Johnson – guitar and vocals
Heather Lewis – drums, guitar, and vocals
Bret Lunsford – guitar and drums

Discography
Albums
1985 – Beat Happening (K Records)
1988 – Jamboree (K Records/Rough Trade)
1989 – Black Candy (K Records/Rough Trade)
1991 – Dreamy (K Records/Sub Pop)
1992 – You Turn Me On (K Records/Sub Pop)

EPs
1984 – Beat Happening Cassette (K Records)
1984 – Three Tea Breakfast Cassette (K Records)
1988 – Crashing Through (53rd & 3rd)
1988 – Beat Happening/Screaming Trees (K Records/Homestead)

Compilations
2002 – Crashing Through (K Records) box set
2003 – Music to Climb the Apple Tree By (K Records)
2015 – Look Around (K/Domino)
2018 – We Are Beat Happening (Domino)

Singles
1984 – "Our Secret" / "What's Important" (K Records)
1987 – "Look Around" / "That Girl" (K Records)
1988 – "Honey Pot" / "Don't Mix The Colors" (53rd & 3rd) [flexi-disc]
1990 – "Red Head Walking" / "Secret Picnic Spot" (Sub Pop)
1990 – "Nancy Sin" / "Dreamy" (K Records)
1991 – "Sea Hunt" / "Knock On Any Door" (Bi-Joopiter)
2000 – "Angel Gone" / "Zombie Limbo Time" (K Records)
2001 – "Crashing Through" / "The This Many Boyfriends Club" (K Records)

References

External links
 K Records Official Website

 
1982 establishments in Washington (state)
Indie rock musical groups from Washington (state)
Indie pop groups from Washington (state)
K Records artists
Lo-fi music groups
Musical groups established in 1982
Musical groups from Olympia, Washington
Proto-riot grrrl bands
Sub Pop artists
Thurston County, Washington